The Chairman Mao Memorial Hall, also known as the Mausoleum of Mao Zedong, is the final resting place of Mao Zedong, Chairman of the Politburo of the Chinese Communist Party from 1943 and the Chairman of the Chinese Communist Party from 1945 until his death in 1976.

Although Mao had wished to be cremated, his wishes were ignored and his body was embalmed. The construction of a memorial hall as his final resting place began shortly after his death. This highly popular attraction is located in the middle of Tiananmen Square in Beijing. It stands on the previous site of the Gate of China, the southern (main) gate of the Imperial City during the Ming and Qing dynasties.

The embalmed body of Chairman Mao is preserved in the cooler, central hall of the memorial hall in a glass case with dim lighting; it is guarded by a military honor guard. The memorial hall is open to the public every day except Mondays.

History
 

The memorial hall was built soon after Mao's death on September 9, 1976. The groundbreaking ceremony took place November 24, 1976, and the memorial hall was completed on May 24, 1977. Chairman Hua Guofeng, who supervised the memorial hall project, has his handwriting on the memorial hall's sign.

People throughout China were involved in the design and construction of the memorial hall, with 700,000 people from different provinces, autonomous regions, and nationalities doing symbolic voluntary labor. Materials from all over China were used throughout the building: granite from Sichuan province, porcelain plates from Guangdong province, pine trees from Yan'an in Shaanxi province, saw-wort seeds from the Tian Shan mountains in the Xinjiang Autonomous Region, earth from quake-stricken Tangshan, colored pebbles from Nanjing, milky quartz from the Kunlun Mountains, pine logs from Jiangxi province, and rock samples from Mount Everest. Water and sand from the Taiwan Straits were also used to symbolically emphasize the People's Republic of China's claims over Taiwan. The memorial hall was closed for renovations for nine months in 1997 before reopening on January 6, 1998.

Sculptures

Inside the memorial hall is a statue of Mao. There are four sculptural groups installed outside the memorial hall.

Visits
The memorial hall today remains a popular destination in Beijing, and is often visited by foreign dignitaries and Chinese Communist Party officials. Foreign heads of state, such as Cuban leader Fidel Castro and Venezuelan President Nicolas Maduro visited the memorial hall during their state trips to China.

On 29 September 2019, General Secretary Xi Jinping along with other Politburo members of the Chinese Communist Party visited the Chairman Mao Memorial Hall.

Xu Jing, one of the designers involved in the memorial hall's construction, later wrote about the process in The Place Where a Great Man Rests as well as listing the visits of important people to the memorial hall.

See also 
 Mao Zedong's Former Residence and Memorial Museum in Shaoshan
 Mausoleum of Hua Guofeng
 Zhou Enlai Memorial Hall in Huaian
 Memorial to Zhou Enlai and Deng Yingchao
 Deng Xiaoping's Former Residence and Memorial Hall in Guangan
 Zhu De Memorial Hall
 Babaoshan Revolutionary Cemetery
 Kumsusan Palace of the Sun
 Ho Chi Minh Mausoleum
 Lenin's Mausoleum
 Sun Yat-sen Mausoleum

References 

1977 establishments in China
Buildings and structures completed in 1977
Buildings and structures in Beijing
Dongcheng District, Beijing
Mao Zedong
Mausoleums in China
Tiananmen Square
Tourist attractions in Beijing